Margaret of Prades (1388/95 – 23 July 1429) was Queen of Aragon by marriage to King Martin of Aragon.

Life
She was the daughter of Peter of Aragon, Baron of Entenza (1352–1395), and his wife, Joana of Cabrera.

On 17 September 1409, Margaret married Martin of Catalonia-Aragon, a second cousin of her father. The bride was about fourteen years old and the groom fifty-three. Martin had survived all his legitimate children from his first marriage with Maria de Luna and was in need of a legitimate heir of his own. On 31 March 1410, Martin I died after six months of marriage. They had no children. His death led to a two-year interregnum, which was ended by the Pact of Caspe, in which Ferdinand I of Aragon, younger son of his sister Eleanor, was chosen as the next king.

Margaret remained a widow for about four years. She married her second husband John of Vilaragut in 1415. In secret, she gave birth to a son in 1416, whose name was Joan Jeroni de Vilaragut (1416–1452). John died in 1422 and Margaret entered the monastery of Bonrepòs. She died in 1429.

Notes

External links

1395 births
1422 deaths
Aragonese queen consorts
Countesses of Barcelona
Majorcan queens consort
Royal consorts of Sicily
Remarried royal consorts
14th-century Aragonese monarchs
14th-century Spanish women
15th-century Aragonese monarchs
15th-century Spanish women